

The Airmaster H2-B1 is a British two-seat ultralight helicopter built by Airmaster Helicopters of Camberley, Surrey.

Development
The H2-B1 was designed with the co-operation of the builders of the American Helicom helicopter. Construction of the prototype, registered G-AYNS, was started in September 1970 and it was first flown from Redhill Aerodrome on 12 September 1972. It was intended that an improved H2-B2 variant would enter production but only the prototype H2-B1 was built.

Design
The H2-B1 is a two-seat ultralight helicopter with a single two-bladed main rotor and a two-bladed tail rotor. The fuselage is a welded tubular structure skinned with aluminium and had two side-by-side configuration seats for the pilot and a passenger, it is also fitted with a skid landing gear, small wheels are fitted to allow the helicopter to be moved on the ground. The engine is a  Rolls-Royce Continental O-200-A air-cooled engine driving the main and tail rotors through a simple gearbox.

Variants
H2-B1
Prototype, one built
H2-B2
Proposed production variant with streamlined fuselage and a monocoque tailboom, not built.

Specifications

See also

References

Notes

Bibliography

1970s British civil utility aircraft
1970s British helicopters
Aircraft first flown in 1972